The triphenylmethyl radical (often shorted to trityl radical) is an organic compound with the formula (C6H5)3C. It is a persistent radical. It was the first radical ever to be described in organic chemistry.  Because of its accessibility, the trityl radical has been heavily exploited.

Preparation and properties 
It can be prepared by homolysis of triphenylmethyl chloride 1 by a metal like silver or zinc in benzene or diethyl ether. The radical 2 forms a chemical equilibrium with the quinoid-type dimer 3 (Gomberg's dimer). In benzene the concentration of the radical is 2%.

Solutions containing the radical are yellow; when the temperature of the solution is raised, the yellow color becomes more intense as the equilibrium is shifted in favor of the radical (in accordance with Le Chatelier's principle).

When exposed to air, the radical rapidly oxidizes to the peroxide, and the color of the solution changes from yellow to colorless. Likewise, the radical reacts with iodine to triphenylmethyl iodide.

While the trityl radical forms a quinoid dimer, derivatives thereof with the appropriate substitution pattern do form dimers with a hexaphenylethane structure. X-ray studies give a bond length of 1.67 Å for hexakis(3,5-di-t-butylphenyl)ethane. Theoretical calculations on a very high level of theory indicate that van der Waals attraction between the tert-butyl groups create a potential minimum that is absent in the unsubstituted molecule. Other derivatives have been reported as the quinoid dimer

History 
The radical was discovered by Moses Gomberg in 1900 at the University of Michigan. He tried to prepare hexaphenylethane from triphenylmethyl chloride and zinc in benzene in a Wurtz reaction and found that the product, based on its behaviour towards iodine and oxygen, was far more reactive than anticipated. The discovered structure was used in the development of ESR spectroscopy and confirmed by it.

The correct quinoid structure for the dimer was suggested as early as 1904 but this structure was soon after abandoned by the scientific community in favor of hexaphenylethane (4). It subsequently took until 1968 for its rediscovery when researchers at the Vrije Universiteit Amsterdam published proton NMR data.

See also
 Triphenylmethyl hexafluorophosphate
 Triphenylmethane
 Triarylmethane dye
 Trivalent group 14 radicals

References

External links
 Molecule of the Month, June 1997
 Triphenylmethyl radical : properties and synthesis

Free radicals
Phenyl compounds